Martin Quinn may refer to:

Martin Quinn (mayor) (born 1949), Irish Fianna Fáil politician
Martin Quinn (Irish senator) (died 1946), Irish senator
Martin-Quinn scores, used to assess the ideological leanings of U.S. Supreme Court justices over time